Jimmy Deenihan (born 11 September 1952) is an Irish former Fine Gael politician who served as Minister of State for the Diaspora from 2014 to 2016, Minister for Arts, Heritage and the Gaeltacht from 2011 to 2014 and Minister of State at the Department of Agriculture, Food and Forestry from 1994 to 1997. He served as a Teachta Dála (TD) from 1987 to 2016. He was a Senator from 1983 to 1987, after being nominated by the Taoiseach.

Deenihan played Gaelic football for the Kerry county team in the 1970s and 1980s. He also played rugby with Garryowen.

Early and private life
Deenihan was born in Finuge, Lixnaw, County Kerry, in 1952. He was educated at St Michael's College, Listowel and later at the Thomond College of Education in Limerick. He also spent time in college in the UK. He is married to Mary, daughter of former Kerry footballer John Dowling, who is a teacher of history and economics in Mercy Secondary School, Mounthawk.

Football career

Club
Deenihan had much success at club and divisional level with his local teams. At under-age level he won an under-14 North Kerry Championship with Finuge in 1963. Five years later in 1968, he won an under-16 North Kerry Championship with the Listowel Emmet's club. He also played with the St Senan's club at minor level. With Finuge Deenihan also won a North Kerry Senior League title in 1970, as well as a North Kerry Senior Championship title in 1987. With his local divisional team, Feale Rangers, he won two senior county championship medals in 1978 and 1980. While in college at St Mary's University, Twickenham in London he played with the Kingdom club and won a London Senior Football Championship.

Inter-county
By the late 1960s, Deenihan was a key part of Kerry's inter-county set-up and was playing on the county's minor team. In 1970, he won a Munster minor medal, however, he never won an All-Ireland medal. Deenihan later moved on to the county's under-21 team, where he won back-to-back Munster titles in 1972 and 1973, as well as an All-Ireland title in 1973.

By this stage, Deenihan was also a member of the Kerry senior football team. He won his first National Football League medal in 1973, however, Cork were the kingpins in the Munster Championship. Two years later in 1975, Deenihan captured his first Munster Championship and All-Ireland medals at senior level, under the new management of the legendary Mick O'Dwyer. It was the beginning of a glorious era for Kerry football and Deenihan played a key role in orchestrating much of the success.

In 1976, Deenihan won his second Munster title, however, Dublin gained revenge for the previous year by defeating Kerry in the All-Ireland final. 1977 was another frustrating year as Kerry won another set of National league and Munster titles but lost out to Dublin yet again, this time in the All-Ireland semi-final. By 1978, Kerry were ready for success. They easily won another Munster title and breezed into the All-Ireland final to face Dublin. The game itself is remembered for Mikey Sheehy's cheeky goal which he scored by lobbing the ball over the head of Paddy Cullen. The final score was 5–11 to 0–9 and Deenihan had finally secured a second All-Ireland medal. In 1979, Deenihan captured a fifth provincial title before later capturing a third All-Ireland medal following another emphatic victory over Dublin.

In 1980, Kerry breezed through the Munster Championship once again and later defeated Roscommon to win a third consecutive All-Ireland title. In 1981, Deenihan was appointed captain of the Kerry senior football team. It was a very special year as he collected his seventh consecutive Munster Championship medal before later leading Kerry out in a fourth All-Ireland final appearance. On the day the men from 'the Kingdom' easily defeated Offaly to give Deenihan his fifth All-Ireland medal. He rounded off the year by being presented with an All-Star award. At the start of 1982 Deenihan won a third National League medal when he captained Kerry to victory over Cork. Later that summer he broke his leg in training. He remained out of the game for eight months, meaning the injury effectively ended his inter-county career. Deenihan's last appearance in a Kerry jersey was in May 1983 when he played a challenge game at the opening of the Tarbert GAA field.

Deenihan also won Railway Cup medals with Munster in 1975, 1976, 1978, 1981 and 1982.

Political career

Seanad and Dáil Éireann
As Deenihan's inter-county football career was drawing to a close, his political career was just beginning. He unsuccessfully contested Kerry North at the November 1982 general election. In 1983, he was appointed to Seanad Éireann as a nominee of Taoiseach Garret FitzGerald. Deenihan later became involved in local politics as a member of Kerry County Council. He was elected to Dáil Éireann for the first time at the 1987 general election, for Kerry North, and was re-elected there at the six subsequent general elections.

Deenihan held a number of front bench portfolios for Fine Gael, including Youth and Sport (1988–1992) and Tourism and Trade (1992–1994) while Fine Gael were in opposition. In 1994 Fine Gael came to office without a general election, and on 20 December 1994 Deenihan was appointed by the Fine Gael–Labour–Democratic Left coalition government as Minister of State at the Department of Agriculture, Food and Forestry. In 1997, he became party spokesperson for the Office of Public Works. In the 2002 general election, which resulted in a near meltdown for Fine Gael, Deenihan saw his toughest election to date, being re-elected by a margin of almost 500 votes ahead of sitting TD Dick Spring. After the election of Enda Kenny as party leader he again received a Fine Gael front bench position as party spokesperson for Arts, Sport and Tourism. In the aftermath of the 2007 general election, he became party spokesperson on Defence, after being elected atop the poll in the Kerry North constituency with 12,697 votes. In July 2010, he was appointed as party spokesperson on Tourism, Culture and Sport.

Minister for Arts, Heritage and the Gaeltacht
At the 2011 general election, he was elected for the new constituency of Kerry North–West Limerick. On 9 March 2011, he was appointed a member of the Fine Gael–Labour government as Minister for Arts, Heritage and the Gaeltacht.

In May 2011, he set out proposals to acquire from the Bank of Ireland the old Irish Parliament building in College Green for the state, to use as a cultural venue.

In November 2011, he met with the stars of Titanic: Blood & Steel, while they were filming on location in Dublin.

He was reported by the Irish Examiner as having announced the awarding of the title of City of Culture 2014 to Limerick in June 2012 without indicating the criteria for selection.

Minister of State for the Diaspora
On 11 July 2014, he was dropped as a cabinet minister in a reshuffle, and was appointed by the government as Minister of State at the Department of the Taoiseach and at the Department of Foreign Affairs and Trade with responsibility for the Diaspora.

His constituency was abolished at the 2016 general election; he stood for election in Kerry, but was not elected.

References

 

1952 births
Living people
All-Ireland-winning captains (football)
All Stars Awards winners (football)
Alumni of the University of Limerick
Fine Gael senators
Fine Gael TDs
Fingue Gaelic footballers
Gaelic football backs
Gaelic footballers who switched code
Garryowen Football Club players
Irish schoolteachers
Irish sportsperson-politicians
Kerry inter-county Gaelic footballers
Listowel Emmets Gaelic footballers
Local councillors in County Kerry
Members of the 17th Seanad
Members of the 25th Dáil
Members of the 26th Dáil
Members of the 27th Dáil
Members of the 28th Dáil
Members of the 29th Dáil
Members of the 30th Dáil
Members of the 31st Dáil
Ministers of State of the 27th Dáil
Ministers of State of the 31st Dáil
Nominated members of Seanad Éireann
People educated at St Michael's College, Listowel
Politicians from County Kerry
Rugby union players from County Kerry
St Senan's (Kerry) Gaelic footballers
Winners of five All-Ireland medals (Gaelic football)